Lupersat is a commune in the Creuse department in the Nouvelle-Aquitaine region in central France.

Geography

Population

Sights
 The church, dating from the twelfth century.
 A sixteenth-century presbytery.
 A fourteenth-century house at La Chezotte.
 The remains of a fifteenth-century château at Lavaux-Graton.
 A chapel with a tower, at Monteil-Sugnet

See also
Communes of the Creuse department

References

Communes of Creuse